Adela Helić (born 24 February 1990) is a Serbian volleyball player. 
She was part of the Serbia women's national volleyball team.

She participated in the 2015 FIVB Volleyball World Grand Prix.
On club level she played for OK Crvena Zvezda in 2015.

References

External links
 http://www.scoresway.com/?sport=volleyball&page=player&id=8201
 
 http://www.worldofvolley.com/News/Latest_news/Serbia/26309/srb-w-adela-helic-destroyed-zeleznicar.html

1990 births
Living people
Serbian women's volleyball players
Place of birth missing (living people)
Serbian expatriate sportspeople in Poland
21st-century Serbian women